Cañazas is a corregimiento in Cañazas District, Veraguas Province, Panama with a population of 4,836 as of 2010. It is the seat of Cañazas District. Its population as of 1990 was 8,015; its population as of 2000 was 5,346.

An extinct, unclassified indigenous language known as Urraca or Esquegua was spoken just north of the modern city of Cañazas, Panama. (See List of unclassified languages of South America#Northern Andes.)

References

Corregimientos of Veraguas Province